Marjan Eid (born 12 May 1979) is a Bahraini football manager, most recently managed the Bahrain national football team.

Bahrain results

References

1979 births
Living people
Bahraini footballers
Association football midfielders
Bahraini football managers
Bahrain national football team managers
2015 AFC Asian Cup managers